"Run Boy Run" is a song by Yoann Lemoine, under his stage name Woodkid. It was released as the second single from his debut studio album, The Golden Age (2013). It was written by Lemoine and Ambroise Willaume from the French band Revolver. The single was released on 21 May 2012, becoming his highest-charting single. "Run Boy Run" was certified gold in Germany in 2014.

Music video
The music video for Woodkid track "Run Boy Run" was nominated for Best Short Form Music Video at the 2013 Grammy Awards. It shows a young boy running, surrounded by various beasts that pick him up when he falls, hand him a sword and a shield, and  put a horned helmet on his head. The video was directed by Lemoine himself.

In popular culture
 "Run Boy Run" was used in several O2 adverts (those voiced by Sean Bean) and in a Vodafone advert. It was used in the trailer for Now You See Me.
 The music has been featured in the introduction of the [[Kony 2012#2013 film What happened to KONY 2012?|2013 follow-up film What happened to KONY 2012?]].
 Part of the song was played during the MTV Movie Awards 2013. When Liam Hemsworth was announcing for the teaser trailer for The Hunger Games: Catching Fire.
 It was used in the debut trailer for Techland's game Dying Light.
 It was used in the trailer for 42.
 It was used in the trailer for the BBC One series The Musketeers.
 It was used in the trailer for the final series of the BBC Three series Being Human.
 It was used in ads for the Power Horse energy drink in the Middle East and North Africa.
 Also used during several episodes of ITV's X Factor boot camp stages of the competition and RTL's Deutschland sucht den Superstar.
 Played in an episode of MTV's Teen Wolf (2x11 Battlefield, during the lacrosse game).
 Played in an episode of the CW's  Reign (1x04 Hearts and Minds).
 Played in an episode of the CW's  Cult (1x02 In the Blood).
 The final minute of the song serves as music background for Discovery Channel Iberia promo campaign "My Territory is Discovery" (2014).
 The song was used during the BBC Sports Personality of the Year 2014 feature with highlights from the 2014 Football World Cup.
 It appears on the soundtrack of the 2014 film Divergent.The instrumental is also used in the film when Tris is running for the train, after choosing the Dauntless faction.
 Acrobatic team AcroArmy performed their top 12 routine to it on America's Got Talent.
 On 13 July 2014 BBC Sport prominently featured the song in their final montage of the 2014 FIFA World Cup.
 On 2 September 2014 is used by Sky Italia for the promo of the auditions of X-Factor Italy.
 The instrumental served as the soundtrack for the promotional video of the GoPro Hero 4.
 It was used in trailer for McFarland, USA.
 The song was used for a Paso Doble dance by Bethany Mota and Derek Hough on the show Dancing with the Stars.
 The song is used by Sky Sports in the opening of FL72, which covers Football League matches. 
 The song is also used in multiple adverts for Cancer Research UK.
 It features in the 2015 trailer for Australia's SBS.
 The song later is used as a theme song for the film The Maze Runner.
 Part of the song is used in the BBC America trailer for series 9 of Doctor Who.
 It was used in Sherpas Cinema film Into the Mind.
 It is in the soundtrack of the last episode of the series The Shannara Chronicles (S01e10).
 It was used in certain Cancer Research UK adverts throughout 2014–15.
 Dance troupe Khronos Agoria used the song for their semi-final performance on Britain's Got Talent in May 2016.
 On 10 July 2016 TV4 (Sweden) used the song in its final montage of UEFA Euro 2016.
 It was used in many different gymnastics routines from 2016 Summer Olympics, mostly without vocals.
 It was used at the end of the documentary Playing Straight on the Irish television network RTÉ.
 It was used during a section reflecting on Team GB's success at the 2016 Summer Olympics and Paralympics during the 2016-17 New Year firework display in London with Clare Balding narrating over the song.
 The song was used by the dancing group, Malevo, for their live show on the 11th season of America's Got Talent.
 It was used during The Wind Games 2017 by Kyra Poh whose performance won the Gold in Solo Freestyle.Straits Times, 6 Feb 2017 http://www.straitstimes.com/sport/grandpa-inspires-indoor-skydiver
 It is used by La Une (Belgium) in the closing credits of 7 à la Une.
 It was used in Episode 14 of the third season of How to Get Away with Murder.
 It was used in Episode 5 of the first season of Gatebil on TV2 Zebra in Norway.
 It was used in the ending of Episode 2 of The Netflix show 13 Reasons Why
 It was used in  episode 10 of the first season of Skam
 Angara Contortion group used the song for their audition on Britain's Got Talent in May 2017.
 Billy and Emily England used the song for their Judge Cuts performance in 2017 on season 12 of America's Got Talent.
 It was used in the Paris bid for the 2024 Summer Olympics and the 2024 Summer Paralympics without the vocals.
 It was used in the 2017 racing game Gran Turismo Sport. The song's instrumental version was used in the game's E3 2016 trailer.
 It was used in the trailer for the film "The Post" directed by Steven Spielberg.
 It was used by Lock 'N LoL Crew for their Duel performance in 2018 on Season 2 of World of Dance
 It was used in Episode 2 of the Netflix show The Umbrella Academy. The episode was also titled Run Boy Run.
A portion was used by the Mandarins Drum and Bugle Corps in their 2019 program subTerra.
 An instrumental version of the song is used in the trailer for the 2019 film The Death & Life of John F. Donovan.
 It was played at the 2019 AFC Asian Cup in the United Arab Emirates before kick off.
 It was played at the 2019 FIFA U-17 World Cup in Brazil on every match before kick off.
 It was played at the 2022 FIFA U-17 Women's World Cup in India during every match after the national anthems.
It was used in the Paso Doble dance of Chris Ramsey and Karen Hauer in Week 10 of Season 17 of Strictly Come Dancing on the BBC
 It was featured in a promotional video of the 2020 Audi RS 6 Avant for the United States and Canada.
 An excerpt from the song was played before men's and women's football matches at the 2020 Summer Olympics in Tokyo in 2021.
 It was used in Episode 5 of the Netflix show The Pentaverate.
 It was used in the introduction for the BBC One broadcast of the Wimbledon Championship for the 100 year Centre Court celebration in 2022.
Used in a training video by the Israeli army 2022

 In the popular game Geometry Dash, a player known as "Jakerz95" made a level titled "Woodkid" that uses a version of this song. This caused copyright issues.

Track listing
"Run Boy Run" (album version) – (3:33)
"Run Boy Run" (Sebastian remix) – (3:52)
"Run Boy Run" (Tepr remix) – (5:52)
"Run Boy Run" (Ostend remix) – (4:15)

Charts
Single release'Run Boy Run – Remixes (EP) position'''

Year-end charts

Certifications

References

External links

2012 singles
2011 songs
Woodkid songs
Universal Music Group singles